Handlan's Park is a former baseball ground located in St. Louis, Missouri. The ground was home to the St. Louis Terriers of the Federal League in 1914 and 1915.  
After the Federal League folded, it was used as the St. Louis University Athletic Field, and was also known as High School Field in the 1920s. During that period, the local Sumner High School and Lincoln University baseball clubs held an annual Decoration Day contest there. The St. Louis Giants of the Negro National League played some games there in 1920 and 1921, although that club had its own park on North Broadway.

Surrounded by Grand Avenue on the west, Laclede Avenue on the north, Theresa Avenue to the east, and Clark Avenue to the south, the space used for the park was owned by Alexander H. Handlan. The head of an international railway supply house, Handlan-Buck Manufacturing, Handlan operated a private park at the site aptly named Handlan's Park.

The seating capacity of 15,000 comprised the grandstand at the southeast corner of Laclede and Grand, the pavilion situated near Grand and Clark, and bleachers stretching behind center field between two rows of houses, which were barricaded by tall wooden fences. Home plate was centered in front of the grandstand at Grand and Laclede.

The St. Louis Chapter of the Society for American Baseball Research (SABR) placed a marker at the site of Handlan's Park, now on the campus of Saint Louis University, on October 17, 2007.

References

External link
 A writeup on Federal League arrangements of Handlan's Park

Defunct baseball venues in the United States
Defunct college football venues
Federal League venues
Saint Louis Billikens football
American football venues in Missouri
Baseball venues in St. Louis
Defunct sports venues in Missouri
Former buildings and structures in St. Louis